The TOMVIEW Optimization Environment is a platform for solving applied optimization problems in LabVIEW.

Description
TOMVIEW is a general purpose development environment in LabVIEW for research, teaching and practical solution of optimization problems. It enables a wider range of problems to be solved in LabVIEW and provides many proprietary solvers.

References

External links 
 TOMVIEW - Developers and distributors of the software.

Mathematical optimization software
Visual programming languages